The 2009–10 New Mexico State Aggies men's basketball team represented New Mexico State University in the 2009–10 college basketball season. This was Marvin Menzies 3rd season as head coach. The Aggies played their home games at Pan American Center and competed in the Western Athletic Conference. They finished the season 22–12, 11–5 in WAC play. They won the 2010 WAC men's basketball tournament to earn the conference's automatic bid to the 2010 NCAA Division I men's basketball tournament. They earned a 12 seed in the Midwest Region where they were defeated by 5 seed and AP #13 Michigan State in the first round.

Pre-season
In the WAC preseason polls, released October 20 via media teleconference New Mexico State was selected to finish 3rd in the coaches and media poll. Jr. Jahmar Young was selected to the coaches and media All-WAC first team.

2009–10 Team

Roster
Source

Coaching staff

2009–10 schedule and results
Source
All times are Mountain

|-
!colspan=9| Exhibition

|-
!colspan=9| Regular Season

|-
!colspan=9| 2010 WAC men's basketball tournament

|-
!colspan=10| 2010 NCAA Division I men's basketball tournament

Season highlights
On December 14, Jr. Jahmar Young was named the WAC player of the week for the fifth week of the season with weekly averages of 24.0 PPG, 1.0 RPG, 3.0 AST, and 47.0 FG%.

On February 1, So. Hamidu Rahman was named the WAC player of the week for the twelfth week of the season with weekly averages of 22.0 PPG, 12.0 RPG, and 66.7 FG%.

On February 8, Jr. Jahmar Young was named the WAC player of the week for the thirteenth week of the season with weekly averages of 25.0 PPG, 3.0 RPG, 5.0 AST, and 61.5 FG%.

References

New Mexico State
New Mexico State Aggies men's basketball seasons
New Mexico State
Aggies
Aggies